A bracelet is an article of jewellery that is worn around the wrist. Bracelets may serve different uses, such as being worn as an ornament. When worn as ornaments, bracelets may have a supportive function to hold other items of decoration, such as charms. Medical and identity information are marked on some bracelets, such as allergy bracelets, hospital patient-identification tags, and bracelet tags for newborn babies. Bracelets may be worn to signify a certain phenomenon, such as breast cancer awareness, or for religious/cultural purposes.

If a bracelet is a single, inflexible loop, it is often called a bangle. When it is worn around the ankle it is called an ankle bracelet or anklet. A boot bracelet is used to decorate boots. Bracelets can be manufactured from metal, leather, cloth, plastic, bead or other materials, and jewelry bracelets sometimes contain jewels, rocks, wood, shells, crystals, metal, or plastic hoops, pearls and many more materials.

Origin

Although the term armlet may be technically similar, it is taken to mean an item that sits on the upper shoulder: an arm ring.  The origin of the term 'bracelet' is from the Greek  meaning 'of the arm', via the Old French . A bracelet is also a small brace or bracer (an arm-guard used by archers).

Cultural and religious significance
The history of Egyptian bracelets is as old as 5000 BCE. Starting with materials like bones, stones and woods to serve religious and spiritual interests. From the National Geographic Society, the Scarab Bracelet is one of the most recognized symbols of ancient Egypt. The scarab represented rebirth and regeneration. Carved scarabs were worn as jewelry and wrapped into the linen bandages of mummies. Myth told of the scarab god, Khepri, pushing the sun across the sky.

In 2008, Russian archaeologists from the Institute of Archaeology and Ethnology of Novosibirsk, working at the site of Denisova Cave in the Altai Mountains of Siberia, uncovered a small bone fragment from the fifth finger of a juvenile hominin, dubbed the "X woman" (referring to the maternal descent of mitochondrial DNA), or the Denisova hominin. Artifacts, including a bracelet, excavated in the cave at the same level were carbon dated to around 40,000 BP.

In Bulgaria, there is a tradition called martenitsa, which sometimes involves tying a red and white string around the wrist to please Baba Marta in order for spring to come sooner.

In Greece, a similar tradition, weaving a bracelet from a red and white string on the first day of March and wearing it till the end of summer, is called "Martis" and is considered to help protect the wearer's skin from the strong Greek sun.

In some parts of India, the number and type of bangles worn by a woman denotes her marital status

In Sikhism, an iron bracelet is one of the most mandatory articles known as the Five Ks.

In Latin America, Azabache Bracelets are worn to protect against the Mal de ojo, or evil eye. The evil eye is believed to result of excessive admiration or envious looks by others. Having newborn babies wear an azabache (a gold bracelet or necklace with a black or red coral charm in the form of a fist), is believed to protect them from the evil eye.

Types

Alternative health 
Alternative health bracelets, such as ionized bracelets, karma bracelets, magnetic bracelets, Power Balance hologram bracelets, etc., are not distinguished by their design but rather the beneficial function claimed for them by their manufacturers and distributors. Karma bracelets are made from wood beads and may contain various charms, and are associated with bringing good luck and good karma to those who choose to wear it.  No claims of effectiveness made by manufacturers have ever been substantiated by independent sources.

Bangles 

Hard material or rigid bracelets, usually made from metal, wood, or plastic, are referred to as bangles or bangle bracelets. They can be smooth, textured or set with stones. In India, glass bangles are common. In India, it is also common that young children will wear thin gold bangles on their hands and ankles.

Beaded  

Usually made from loose beads with a center hole and connected by a piece of string or elastic band through the holes. Most often made with wooden beads, plastic, glass or even crystal beads.

Charm  
A charm bracelet carries personal charms: decorative pendants or trinkets which are signifiers of important things, interests/hobbies, and memories in the wearer's life. The decorative charms usually carry personal or sentimental attachment by the owner. Are popular with all age ranges, but especially for children.

In recent history, Italian charm bracelets have become trendy.  While traditional charms dangle, Italian charms feature individual pieces soldered flat onto the surface of the link.

Link  

Bracelets made from connecting or linking various or similar components or jewelry findings. Link bracelets can be made of a variety of materials including metals and gemstones.

Penannular
Penannular, meaning an incomplete circle, has been a very common form for bracelets, especially ones made in a single piece of a slightly flexible material such as metal or plastic.  It is particularly popular in gold.

Slap  
In the late 1980s and early 1990s, "slap bracelets"—flat, felt-covered metal strips that curved around one's wrist when gently hit against it—were a popular fad. Often adorned with neon colors and vivid graphics, these bracelets could be found at inexpensive retailers. A false rumor emerged that "slap bracelets" caused bleeding and puncture wounds and thus they fell out of style.

Sports  

The use of colored silicone rubber as a material for producing sports bracelets was popularized by Nike and Lance Armstrong through the Yellow Livestrong wristband starting in May 2003. Their success has led to the silicone bracelet becoming a low cost tool for various awareness, information, and charity campaigns.  This can be likened to the use of awareness ribbons for similar purposes. These bracelets are also known as "baller id bands", "baller bands" or "wristbands". They can also be referred to as rubber wristbands, silicone wristbands or gel wristbands. For sport climbing, bracelets are designed with climbing cords (dynamic rope) to serve as a mountain climbing gear.

Tennis  

While playing a match at the 1978 U.S. Open, tennis player Chris Evert was wearing a diamond line bracelet, which fell from her wrist to the surface of the court. She said about this, "I dropped my tennis bracelet", and since then diamond line bracelets have also been called "tennis bracelets". The term tennis bracelet appears in print before this incident, but not necessarily referring to diamond line bracelets. An advertisement for a "sterling tennis bracelet" in The New Yorker in 1975, for example, shows a solid silver bangle featuring a tennis racket design, made by the Gorham Manufacturing Company.

Tennis bracelets are made up of many identical settings, each of which incorporates a hinge. The links are usually riveted or soldered from the sides of the bracelet allowing it to flex freely around the wrist with minimal movement left-to-right. A typical tennis bracelet will feature round diamonds set in four claw settings. Tennis bracelets can be adjusted to fit the wearer by removing links, this must be done by a jeweller.

See also

 Anklet
 Armband
 Brace (armor)
 Friendship bracelet
 Manillas
 Necklace
 POW bracelet
 Red string (Kabbalah)
 Torc
 Slave bracelet
 List of topics characterized as pseudoscience (bracelets with health/healing/performance benefits)

Notes

References

External links

Metropolitan jewelry, a collection catalog from The Metropolitan Museum of Art Libraries (fully available online as PDF), which contains material on bracelets
Bracelets at the University of Michigan Museum of Art
Bracelets at the British Museum

 
Wrist